The third season of the Philippine television reality competition show, The Clash was broadcast by GMA Network. Hosted by Rayver Cruz, Julie Anne San Jose, Ken Chan and Rita Daniela, it premiered on October 3, 2020, on the network's Sabado Star Power and Sunday Grande line up.

Christian Bautista, Ai-Ai delas Alas and Lani Misalucha all returned as the judges for this season, until the latter left the show after filming the first round due to health reasons, then Pops Fernandez from the second round to the live shows. Misalucha later returned to the show to perform for the Christmas TV Special on December 25, after the end of the last episode.

The season ended on December 20, 2020, having Jessica Villarubin as the winner.

Changes

Online auditions
In line during the COVID-19 pandemic in the Philippines, the show held online auditions on April 4 for the season as posted on GMA Network's official website and Facebook page. The auditions had been extended on July 2.

Safety protocol production
Production for the third season resumed on September 16, following the guidelines of health and safety prevention protocols for the cast and crew during taping. Due to the aforementioned restrictions, no live audience was allowed in the studio.

Music
Marc Lopez continued to serve as the musical director for this season. He started arranging some instrumental tracks provided for contenders, as the live band members did not return to the studio due to the pandemic.

Top 30
Following strict recommendations in production before filming; the top 30 clashers are announced, instead of the usual total of 60, on September 24 selected by vocal coach Jai Sabas-Aracama and respected personalities from the music industry. Fritzie Magpoc, Niña Holmes, and Princess Vire all have recently competed in the first two seasons, after all three were eliminated in the preliminary rounds before making to the finals.

The 30 clashers were electronically paired to battle it out in a singing duel with the winner advancing to the next round. Originally, the fifteen clashers are selected at the end of the first round until the show announces a wild card challenge called One More Clash in the sixth episode and brought back the fifteen temporarily eliminated clashers for the judges to choose five additional slots in the Top 20.

Color key

	
  Winner
  Runner-up 
  Finalists
  Eliminated in the Fifth Round
  Eliminated in the Fourth Round
  Eliminated in the Third Round
  Eliminated in the Second Round
  Eliminated in the First Round
 Bolded names are returning contestants from previous seasons
 Underlined name was the clasher who won the One More Clash round.

aFritzie Magpoc was reinstated in the competition after beating out Yuri Javier in The Clash Back on December 13, 2020.

Round 1: Laban Kung Laban
In lieu to safety protocol of the show, the production drafts six clashers to each episode for the randomizer to draft three battles in the clash arena until the majority of the judges' decision to advance in the next round.

Color key

Episode 1 (October 3)
The episode opens with a production number from the Clash Masters Rayver Cruz and Julie Anne San Jose, Journey Hosts Ken Chan and Rita Daniela, and Clash panelists Christian Bautista, Ai-Ai delas Alas and Lani Misalucha performing "Bagong Umaga" by Bayang Barrios, followed by an on-screen performance of the Top 30 clashers with the hosts, the judges, and Clash champions Golden Cañedo and Jeremiah Tiangco performing Bayang Barrios and Naliyagan Band's "Lilipad".

Episode hashtag: #TheClash2020

Episode 2 (October 4)

Episode hashtag: #TheClashLabanKungLaban

Episode 3 (October 10)

Episode hashtag: #TopOfTheClash

Episode 4 (October 11)

Episode hashtag: #TheClashTapatan

Episode 5 (October 17)

Episode hashtag: #TheClashFirstTwist

Episode 6 (October 18)

Episode hashtag: #OneMoreClash

The third season introduces One More Clash, a wild card round where all the fifteen eliminated clashers in round one are brought back by the show to compete for the last five slots, instead of fifteen, by performing a reprisal of their songs before their elimination in a medley as groups of three from each episode until the judges deliberate their performances and select the clashers to advance in the Top 20. After the performances; the Clash panel selects Jennie Gabriel, Cholo Bismonte, Rose Velasquez, Rash Almasan and Kyle Pasajol to advance in the Top 20.

Round 2: Kakulay Kalaban
The third season introduces the new challenge in the second round, Kakulay Kalaban where four clashers are electronically selected by the randomizer corresponding to each of the four colors (white, red, black or blue) to take turns picking their sets of clashers. Below is the groupings selection. Italicized names are those electronically selected.

After all four groups are composed, the randomizer electronically selects the group for each episode who will select the clasher to perform first and compete for four seats of the Top 16 and advance in the next round.

Color key

Episode 7 (October 24)
The theme of this challenge performed by the 20 clashers is to sing OPM Music hits in Round 2. Pops Fernandez fill in the judging panel throughout the third season for Lani Misalucha, who later left the show due to health problems.

Episode hashtag: #TheClashBagongLaban

Episode 8 (October 25)

Episode hashtag: #TheClashKakulayKalaban

Episode 9 (October 31)

Episode hashtag: #TheClashAgawanNgUpuan

Non-competition performance:  Blackpink and Selena Gomez's "Ice Cream" by Ai-Ai delas Alas

Episode 10 (November 1)

Episode hashtag: #TheClashHulingApat

Round 3: Pares Kontra Pares
In this round, the clashers were paired. Niña Holmes, who was first to be safe in the Blue group, was selected by the host to choose her partner from the opposite groups for a duet while the selected partner each take turns to compose the pairs. Below is the groupings selection.

1The clasher was selected by the host.

For each set, a pair will be chosen electronically that will choose their opponent pair. After the performance, the clash panel will vote for a pair that will advance on the next round. For the losing pair, they will compete on each other in Matira ang Matibay round and only one will remain, still subject for the votes of the clash panel. The challenged pair will either proceed ("Clash") or opt ("Pass") the opppent pair's challenge for one battle but if the pair choose the latter option, they will automatically competete against another pair selected by the randomizer in the next battle.

Color key

Episode 11 (November 7)

Episode hashtag: #TheClashParesKontraPares 
 

1The clasher was selected by the host.

Episode 12 (November 8)
After using the pass in the previous episode, Sheemee Buenaobra and Aerone Mendoza are challenged by default to compete against the opponent pair selected by the randomizer.

Episode hashtag: #CLASHoPASS

Non-competition performance: BTS' "Dynamite" by Rayver Cruz and Christian Bautista
 

1The clasher was selected by the host.

Episode 13 (November 14)

Episode hashtag: #TheClashMatiraAngMatibay

Non-competition performance: Mariah Carey's "All I Want for Christmas Is You" by Julie Anne San Jose and Rita Daniela

Episode 14 (November 15)

Episode hashtag: #TheClashTop12

Round 4: Royal Rambol
The season introduces the group battles where the randomizer selects three clashers taking turns to pick their members as teams of four. Below is the groupings selection. Italicized names are those electronically selected.

After the performances, the clash panel will vote for two groups that will advance on the next round while the losing group will compete each other in the Matira ang Matibay round and only two clashers will advance, still subject for the votes of the clash panel.

Color key

Episode 15 (November 21)

Episode hashtag: #TheClashRoyalRambol

Episode 16 (November 22)
The losing group compete each other for two remaining spots in the Top 10 where each member choose who to sing next and so on.

Episode hashtag: #TheClashDoubleElimination

Non-competition performance: Gloria Estefan and Miami Sound Machine's "Rhythm Is Gonna Get You" and "Conga" by Pops Fernandez

Round 5: Isa Laban sa Lahat
This is the final round of the competition. Every week, after the performances, the judges will select their top clashers (number depends on every episode) who will stay on the competition while the bottom two clashers will face-off on Matira ang Matibay round on which one clasher will be safe while the other will be eliminated.

Color key

Top 10
The randomizer selected a clasher who will pick a set of clashers that will perform on the episode. The first clasher will select the next clasher to perform next.

The songs performed on this week are called "Laban ng Buhay" of the clashers.

Episode 17 (November 28)
Episode hashtag: #TheClashIsaLabanSaLahat

Matira ang Matibay

Episode 18 (November 29)
Episode hashtag: #TheClashBattleNight

Matira ang Matibay

Top 8
The randomizer selects a clasher. The remaining clashers will then have ten seconds to stand if they wish to challenge the chosen clasher. If no one stands, the chosen clasher will decide who to compete against.

The songs performed on this week are called "Hugot Songs" of the clashers.

Episode 19 (December 5)
Episode hashtag: #TheClashTapang

1Three clashers (Renz, Sheemee, and Jennie) stood which returned the choice to Larnie.2All the remaining clashers stood which returned the choice to Audrey.

Matira ang Matibay

Episode 20 (December 6)
Episode hashtag: #TheClashHeartbreak

1All three remaining clashers stood which returned the choice to Renz.

Matira ang Matibay

Top 6
The clash panel are responsible in picking the order of the clasher's performance by draw lots.

The bottom two clashers are announced and there is no Matira ang Matibay clash on this round instead the bottom clasher will battle the wildcard clasher on the next episode.

The songs performed on this week are called "Fight Songs" of the clashers.

Episode 21 (December 12)
Episode hashtag: #OneBigClash

The Clash Back
The eliminated clashers of the Top 12 has the chance to return to the competition by being a wildcard and the clasher who advanced competes against Javier on the Matira ang Matibay clash.

Episode 22 (December 13)
Episode hashtag:  #TheClashBack

Matira ang Matibay

Final Top 6

Episode 23 (December 19)
Clashers each performed concert-type medley of two songs. The clash panel are responsible in picking the order of the clasher's performance by draw lots.

Episode hashtag: #TheClashConcert

The Final Clash 2020
The Clashers perform in a pre-determined order. Only two clashers will advance to the Ultimate Final Clash to determine the grand champion of this season.

Episode 24 (December 20)
Episode hashtag: #TheFinalClash2020

Final One-on-One Clash

Non-competition performance: Jessica Villarubin as the grand champion performed the song written by the member of clash panel, Christian Bautista entitled "Ako Naman" as the victory song, final performance of the night, and her debut single.

Elimination chart 
Color key

The Clash Christmas Special: Pasko Para sa Lahat
Is a television Christmas concert special of the program thar aired on December 25, 2020.

Episode hashtag: #TheClashChristmasSpecial

Notable contestants
Top 30
Joshua dela Cruz was a regional contender for Luzon on the third season of Tawag ng Tanghalan.
Kelly Garcia participated in the World Championship of Performing Arts (WCOPA) where she won multiple medals.
Monique delos Santos appeared in the tenth season of American Idol and was eliminated in the Green Mile round. She failed to pass the Blind audition in the first season of The Voice of the Philippines while her mother Eva delos Santos, who recently appeared in the first season of The X Factor Philippines, advanced throughout the competition and finished in the fourth week of the Live shows.

Top 20
Judah Vibar was a regional contender for Luzon on the third season of Tawag ng Tanghalan.
Rose Velasquez was a Top 56 artist on the sixth season of The Voice of Romania and also appeared on Tawag ng Tanghalan.

Top 16
The following Top 16 clashers have recently competed on Tawag ng Tanghalan:
Kyle Pasajol was the daily winner on the third season.
Eygee de Vera was a regional contender for Luzon on the first season.
Aerone Mendoza was one of the Top 25 contestants of the boy band talent search competition To the Top where it was hosted by Clash panelist Christian Bautista. He was the two-time defending champion on Tawag ng Tanghalan. He lost to Quarter I semi-finalist Aila Santos.

Top 12
Cholo Bismonte was one of the finalists in Popstar Kids, alongside Clash Master Julie Anne San Jose and Journey host Rita Daniela before they became members of Sugarpop since 2006.
Princess Vire previously participated in the second season where she was eliminated in the second round to Tombi Romulo before being selected to compete for the sixteenth spot against Nef Medina. She first appeared in the first season of Tawag ng Tanghalan and won the Duet with Me segment with journey host Rita Daniela on Studio 7.

Top 10
Sheemee Buenaobra, who previously tried out for the first two seasons, was the daily winner on the third season of Tawag ng Tanghalan. She also appeared as a contestant in the fifth season of the international singing competition D'Academy Asia in Indonesia, representing Philippines and finished in the Top 16; alongside Renz Fernando, who was eliminated in the Top 12, and GMA singer Hannah Precillas who later finish as second runner-up. Fernando later compete in the following season as one of the Top 30 contestants and advance to the live shows before finishing in the Top 7 in The Clash Back episode on December 12.
Larnie Cayabyab recently competes in the singing competition segment, Birit Baby 2009 on Eat Bulaga! and previously competed on the fourth season of Tawag ng Tanghalan.
Jennie Gabriel was a former contestant on the third season of Pinoy Pop Superstar. She also competed in the quarter-end semifinals on the first season of Tawag ng Tanghalan.
Niña Holmes previously competed in the first season but did not advance to the second round. Her husband Bradley Holmes participate in the second season and finished in the Top 32. She first appeared on the first season of Tawag ng Tanghalan.
Yuri Javier was the defending champion on the second quarter of the third season of Tawag ng Tanghalan.
Fritzie Magpoc previously competed in the second season but did not advance to the second round. She first appeared on the first season of Tawag ng Tanghalan.
Audrey Mortilla was one of the contestants on the kids' division on the first season of Little Big Star and also appeared on Tawag ng Tanghalan.
Renz Robosa won the singing challenge segment on the talent search competition Diz Iz It! and has been a finalist in the singing division of Bet ng Bayan and Just Duet on Eat Bulaga!. He also competed on the third season of Tawag ng Tanghalan.

References

External Links
 

2020 Philippine television seasons